The 2nd Dallas-Fort Worth Film Critics Association Awards, given in 1996, honored the best filmmaking of 1995.

Winners
Best Actor: 
Nicolas Cage and Elisabeth Shue - Leaving Las Vegas
Best Director: 
Mike Figgis - Leaving Las Vegas
Best Foreign Language Film:
Les Misérables
Best Picture: 
Leaving Las Vegas
Best Supporting Actor: 
Kevin Spacey - The Usual Suspects
Best Supporting Actress: 
Mira Sorvino - Mighty Aphrodite
Worst Film:
Showgirls

References

External links
Dallas-Fort Worth Film Critics Association official website

1995
1995 film awards